Salaamba is a community in Tamale Metropolitan District in the Northern Region of Ghana. It is a less populated community. Most of the inhabitants(men)  of the community are farmers and the women are also into shea butter.

See also
Suburbs of Tamale (Ghana) metropolis

References 

Communities in Ghana
Suburbs of Tamale, Ghana